Popoli is an Italian magazine of the Jesuits based in Italy. Founded in 1915, the magazine is published by the San Fedele Cultural Foundation of Milan.

History

Le Missioni della Compagnia di Gesù (The Missions of the Society of Jesus) 
In the winter of 1914, Giuseppe Petazzi, a Jesuit priest, began preparations for the publication of a fortnightly journal, named Le Missioni della Compagnia di Gesù, publishing the first issue in January 1915. The magazine aimed at promoting the work of the missions, with a specific reference to members of the Society of Jesus (the Jesuits) in Italy. The publication featured images and began to publish every month in 1943. In 1954, the magazine changed its format from "note-book" to the larger sized format of the present publication. In 1970, the magazine was renamed Popoli e Missioni (Peoples and Missions) with the publisher's new association with the Italian headquarters of Pontifical Mission Societies. At this time, the publication introduced color photographs to become more international in its focus.

Popoli 
In 1987, the magazine entered its third iteration with the adoption of the new title Popoli and the end of its cooperation with the Pontifical Mission Societies. In 1993, the first lay correspondent joined the editing team. The magazine paid increasingly more attention to the imbalances between the North and the South of the world, following in the footsteps of Giuseppe Bellucci (editor-in-chief from 1976), who would query: "are we heading for a new type of exploitation, or a fairer world?" Increasingly, Popoli took on the role of combining information and news with its existing mission role. Father Bellucci left the magazine in 1998, following 22 years of service, and after a brief tenure of Father Giustino Béthaz's as editor-in-chief, Father Bartolomeo Sorge, former editor of both Civiltà Cattolica and Aggiornamenti Sociali, took the lead in 1999. In 2006, Stefano Femminis became editor-in-chief, the first layman to lead a Jesuit magazine in Italy. Popoli has spent the last several years paying increased attention to the dynamics of immigration in Italy and the transformation of a multi-ethnic society. Since 2010, the magazine has been available online, with a wider range of contents and articles than its paper equivalent. One year later, Popoli became the first Catholic magazine in Italy to develop an iPad application.

Aims 
According to Father Bellucci, the magazine aims to:
 Emphasize the cultural and religious values of people in the world. To take the reader, with the aid of the articles and the photos, onto a journey of discovery of one's neighbor.
 Pay special attention to embedding the Gospel into the world's varied cultural areas.
 Stress the ecumenical side of the publication's mission, including dialogue between the Catholic Church and other religious faiths.

Main Features 
Currently, the magazine is built around three "pillars." The first, "Camming di giustizia" (Paths of Justice) deals with social and political issues about the populations of the world's southern region and immigration, including human rights, cooperation, economic imbalances, and the environment. The second, "Identità-differenza" (Identity-Difference) pertains to cultural, anthropological, and religious dimensions that are explored in-depth, alongside the challenge posed by the meeting of different cultures in a globalized world. The third pillar, "Dialogo e Annuncio" (Dialogue and message) is devoted to inter-religion issues, ecumenism, and exploring changes facing the mission today.
The same viewpoints of the real world define the approach of the web magazine and all the editorial initiatives of Popoli.

In-house Correspondents 
 Maurizio Ambrosini – Sociologist
 Stefano Bittasi S.I. – Jesuit and Bible Scholar
 Anna Casella – Anthropologist
 Giacomo Poretti – Comedian
 Paolo Dall'Oglio S.I. – Syria-based Jesuit
 Silvano Fausti S.I. – Jesuit and Bible Scholar
 Thomas J. Reese S.I. – Jesuit and Journalist (Washington)
 Fabrizio Valletti S.I. – Jesuit (Scampia, Naples)

Notes

External links
 Jesuits of Italy 
 Magis – Movimento e azione dei Gesuiti italiani per lo sviluppo 
 Jsn – Jesuit Social Network Italia Onlus 
 Jrs – Jesuit Refugee Service 

1915 establishments in Italy
Italian-language magazines
Monthly magazines published in Italy
Magazines established in 1915
Magazines published in Milan
Catholic magazines published in Italy